Angry Birds: Summer Madness is an animated children's television series developed by Rob Doherty and Scott Sonneborn for Netflix. Based on the Angry Birds franchise by Rovio Entertainment, and loosely based on the characters in the style of The Angry Birds Movie films, the series premiered on January 28, 2022. Season 2 was released on June 24, 2022. Season 3 was released on August 25, 2022, consisting of four specials.

Premise
The series features Red, Stella, Bomb, and Chuck as pre-teens at Camp Splinterwood, with their teacher being Mighty Eagle.

Voice cast

Main characters
 Ian Hanlin as Red and Neiderflyer
 Gigi Saul Guerrero as Stella
 Ty Olsson as Bomb
 Deven Mack as Chuck, Rufus, and the Norm
 Adam Kirschner as Mighty Eagle and Terence
 Tabitha St. Germain as Lynette and Brenda
 Peter Kelamis as Harold
 Ana Sani as Robin and Matilda
 Unknown person as Penley

Other characters
 David Raynold as an unnamed dark blue bird with glasses
 Brian Drummond as two of the Three
 Unknown person as a Duck
 Lee Tockar as Carl

Episodes

Series overview

Season 1 (2022)

Season 2 (2022)

Season 3 (2022)

Production
In late 2018, Rovio announced that a new, long-form Angry Birds television series was in production for a 2020 release. In early 2020, it was announced that the series, titled Angry Birds: Summer Madness, would premiere in 2021 on Netflix. It was eventually released in January 2022. The series consists of 32 11-minute episodes and four 22-minute specials.

Release
Originally slated for a 2021 launch, Angry Birds: Summer Madness premiered on January 28, 2022, globally on Netflix.

References

External links

2022 American television series debuts
2022 British television series debuts
2022 Canadian television series debuts
2020s American animated television series
2020s British animated television series
2020s Canadian animated television series
2020s American children's comedy television series
2020s British children's television series
2020s British comedy television series
2020s Canadian children's television series
2020s Canadian comedy television series
American children's animated comedy television series
British children's animated comedy television series
Canadian children's animated comedy television series
American flash animated television series
British flash animated television series
Canadian flash animated television series
Animated television series about animals
Animated television series about birds
Animated television series about children
Animated television series about pigs
Animated television series by Netflix
Angry Birds television series
English-language Netflix original programming
Netflix children's programming
Television series by Rovio Entertainment
Television series about summer camps